David Richmond may refer to:
David Richmond (officer) (1748–1818), American Revolutionary War commissioned officer
David Richmond (American football) (born 1987), American football wide receiver
David Richmond (activist) (1941–1990), American civil rights activist
David Richmond (Lord Provost of Glasgow) (1843–1908), Scottish businessman and Lord Provost of Glasgow
Dave Richmond, English bass player

See also
David Richmond-Peck (born 1974), Canadian actor